Nine ships of the Royal Navy have borne the name HMS Undaunted:

  was a 28-gun sixth rate, formerly the French storeship and prison ship La Bienvenue, captured by the British in 1794 and sold in 1795.
 HMS Undaunted was previously HMS Arethusa, a 38-gun fifth rate captured from the French in 1793.  She was renamed HMS Undaunted in 1795 and was wrecked in 1796.
  was a 38-gun fifth rate launched in 1807, used as a target from 1856 and broken up by 1860.
  was a wood screw frigate launched in 1861 and sold in 1882.
  was an  launched in 1886 and broken up in 1907.
  was an  light cruiser launched in 1914 and scrapped in 1923.
  was U-class submarine launched in 1940 and sunk in 1941.
  was a U-class destroyer launched in 1943, converted into an anti-submarine frigate between 1952 and 1954, and sunk as a target in 1978.

See also
USS Undaunted

Royal Navy ship names